This is a list of Baptist churches in the U.S. state of Alabama that are notable because they are National Historic Landmarks (NHL), listed on the National Register of Historic Places (NRHP), listed on the Alabama Register of Landmarks and Heritage (ARLH), or are otherwise significant for their history, association with significant events or people, or their architecture and design.

Baptist churches have been centers of worship and leadership in the state from the Mississippi Territorial period onward.  Early Baptist churches were usually biracial in membership, although the African American members were almost always slaves belonging to the white congregants.  The church buildings were often simple and unadorned. As the pioneer period faded and society developed, the churches tended to reflect the social order of southern society via gender, class, and racial divisions.  Sometimes there were separate entrance doors for male and female members, with members remaining separated by gender inside.  In wealthier communities, the more well-to-do members usually had reserved seats in the front. Slaves were always relegated to the rear or a mezzanine gallery in the building.

Baptist churches played pivotal roles in such issues as national divisions over the issue of slavery and the Civil Rights Movement.  The Alabama Baptist Convention formed in 1823, only a few years after statehood, and helped lead the breakaway of southern Baptist churches from their northern counterparts many years prior to the outbreak of the American Civil War.  The Alabama convention, along with Baptist conventions in other southern states, formed the Southern Baptist Convention after the breakup over the legality of slavery.  Considered by Southern Baptists in Alabama as one of the most important churches during the early years of statehood is the Siloam Baptist Church in Marion.  The congregation was established in 1822. The current brick Greek Revival building was completed in 1848.  It is considered by Baptist leaders in the state as one of the most important mother churches of many of Alabama's Baptist institutions and churches because members of this church were instrumental in establishing both Judson College in 1838 and Howard College, now Samford University,  in 1841.  Judson College remains in Marion, while Howard College was moved to Birmingham in 1887 and was later renamed Samford University.

Although some African American Baptist churches formed in Alabama's cities prior to the Civil War, such as the St. Louis Street Missionary Baptist Church that formed in 1836 in Mobile, most African Americans in Alabama separated from white-dominated churches and set up their own congregations after the war and end of slavery. African-American Baptist congregations in Alabama played an important primary role in the civil rights movement in the United States. The St. Louis Street Missionary Baptist Church was host to the seventh Colored Baptist Convention of Alabama in 1874, a meeting that lead to the formation of Selma University in 1878. The Dexter Avenue Baptist Church is a National Historic Landmark near the Alabama State Capitol in Montgomery.  Dr. Martin Luther King Jr. helped to organize the Montgomery bus boycott in the church's basement.  The 16th Street Baptist Church is nationally known as the site of a Civil Rights-era bombing that killed four young girls.  The church had served as an organizational headquarters, site of mass meetings and rallying point for blacks protesting widespread institutionalized racism in Birmingham.  It is also recognized as a National Historic Landmark due to the fact that the tragedy marked a turning point in the Civil Rights Movement and contributed to the public outcry that added support for the passage of the Civil Rights Act of 1964.

In 1995, the Southern Baptist Convention voted to adopt a resolution that renounced its racist roots and apologized for its past defense of slavery.  Alabama Baptist Convention churches and denominational leadership were supportive of this apology. In the first decade of the 21st century, two out of every three church members in Alabama and more than two-fifths of all residents consider themselves Baptists, with 1.1 million belonging to the churches in the Southern Baptist Convention and another 750,000, primarily African Americans, belonging to a variety of other Baptist associations.  Following the 2011 Super Outbreak in Alabama, many Alabama Baptist churches of all races were active in providing relief to the victims.

See also
History of Baptists in Alabama
List of Baptist churches in the United States

References

Baptist churches